Keagan Masters (born 2 March 2000) is a South African racing driver who currently competes in the Sasol GTC Championship. He has taken three championship titles in the series, two in the GTC2 Class (2017, 2018) and one in the GTC Class (2019).

References

2000 births
South African racing drivers
Living people